Metriocheila nigricollis is a species of beetle in the family Cicindelidae, the only species in the genus Metriocheila.

References 

Cicindelidae
Beetles described in 1842